William Ruthven may refer to:

 William Ruthven, 1st Lord Ruthven (died 1513)
 William Ruthven, 2nd Lord Ruthven (died 1552)
 William Ruthven, 1st Earl of Gowrie (c.1541–1584), known as the Lord Ruthven 1566–1581
 William Ruthven (Australian soldier) (1893–1970), Australian soldier and politician

See also
 Ruthven (disambiguation)
 William Ruthven Smith (1868–1941), an American soldier